Philippine–Spanish Friendship Day celebrates the strong links between the Republic of the Philippines and the Kingdom of Spain every June 30. It commemorates the day when General Emilio Aguinaldo, president of the First Philippine Republic, issued a decree requiring the last Spanish soldiers who had been besieged for almost a year inside Baler's church be treated not as enemies and prisoners of war, but as friends. It also ordered that they receive the necessary permission for their return to Spain.

Senator Edgardo Angara, the Friendship Day's main sponsor, described this occasion as, "a glorious day for both countries because the Siege of Baler brought heroes and victory for both parties."
Today, it symbolizes the great friendship between both countries.

Background
The Philippine–Spanish Friendship Day Bill was passed on July 22, 2002, and Republic Act No. 9187 was approved on February 5, 2003—both as means to strengthen the relationship between two nations that share history, values and traditions.

Republic Act No. 9187 states:

Siege of Baler

Philippine–Spanish Friendship Day relates to Siege of Baler. A group of Spanish soldiers garrisoned inside the town church in Baler, Aurora and defended the Spanish flag from July 1, 1898, to June 2, 1899—without knowing that Spain had already give its principal colony in Asia independence on December 10, 1898, by signing of the Treaty of Paris.

Heroism and stubbornness let the 33 soldiers, commanded by Captain Enrique de las Morenas y Fossí and Lieutenant Saturnino Martín y Cerezo, not only to survive, but to earn the respect of the revolutionary army of the Malolos Republic, whose safe return to Spain was ordered by General Emilio Aguinaldo. This group of soldiers came to be known as Los últimos de Filipinas (The last ones of the Philippines).

The Siege of Baler was led by Revolutionary Colonel Simon Ocampo Tecson of San Miguel, Bulacan, the field commanding officer - List of Filipino Generals in the Philippine Revolution of 1896 and the Filipino-American War of 1899.

Celebration in the Philippines

Bilateral relations between the Kingdom of Spain and the Republic of the Philippines had been steadily improving since the formal establishment of Sovereign Tagalog Nation in 1896, Republic of Biak-na-Bato in 1897, Cantonal Republic of Negros in 1898 and Malolos Republic and Republic of Zamboanga in 1899. The Republic of the Philippines and the Kingdom of Spain have renewed their 1947 Treaty of Friendship, expanding it to a Treaty of Friendship and Cooperation in the year 2000. On June 30, 2003, the first celebration of Philippine–Spanish Friendship Day took place in the Philippine town of Baler, Aurora Province, with Senator Edgardo Angara as host. Guests for this first event were, among others, President Gloria Macapagal Arroyo (one of the directors of Philippine Academy of the Spanish Language) and the head of Agencia Española de Cooperación Internacional (Spanish International Cooperation Agency), Dr. Rafael Rodríguez-Ponga Salamanca, the special representative for this occasion, who read an official message from H.M. the King of Spain. It is also celebrated yearly in the town of San Miguel, Bulacan in the house of Simon Tecson - Tecson House. It is the same house where the first Philippine Constitution was ratified with Emilio Aguinaldo.

Since 2003, this celebration has acquired more and more relevance and has kept growing in terms of the amount of activities and projects, which have been organised in different locations:

Celebration in Spain
Since 2006, Philippine–Spanish Friendship Day has been simultaneously celebrated and organised in different locations of Spain such as Madrid, Barcelona, Palencia and Almonte in Huelva.
In Madrid, several institutions such as the Philippine Embassy and the Asociación Cultural Galeón de Manila celebrate this Friendship Day since 2009.

Today, many titles of nobility were named after Philippine areas, such as the Vizcondado de Mindanao or Viscountship of Mindanao and Condado de Jolo or County of Jolo--- both titles held by the Malcampo family and headed by Cristina Osorio Malcampo, the 8th Duchess of San Lorenzo de Valhermoso

The Condado de la Conquista de Islas Batanes or the County of the Conquest of the Batanes Islands was held by Jose Basco y Vargas, a governor general of the Philippines.

The Condado de Albay or the County of Albay was held by Pedro de Govantes and now held by Pilar Beatriz Arizaga de Govantes, whose husband was the once powerful Economic advisor of Spain and Caixabank. The Govantes River that flows by Vigan--- also known as Ciudad Real de la Villa Fernandina--- prior to it reaching the sea, was named after one of his ancestors.

Don Pedro Govantes was a politician just like his uncle, the Prime Minister of Spain Marcelo Azcarraga y Palmero of Cuba and Escolta, Manila, whose very own mother Maria Versosa Palmero Lizarrabal of Albay was related to the Count of Lizarraga. Calle Azcarraga also known as Paseo de Azcarraga was once the name of Quiapo's major thoroughfare, Claro M. Recto Boulevard.

His wife's family, the Fesser-Diago, owned all the sugar rail lines around Havana (El Ferrocaril de la Bahia de la Habana / Las Lineas de La Regla y Matanzas)), and stored more than a third of Cuba's legendary sugar (Almacenes de Azucar de La Habana), plus lots of azucareras and a gigantic bank, Banco y Casa de Seguros de Fesser. Their daughter, Margarita de Trenor, was the first Marquesa de Turia, a title still held by his direct descendant, Don Tomas Trenor, of Valencia, the present Marquis. A son of Prime Minister Azcarraga, Carlos, was active in Spanish politics.

Both the Govantes and Azcarraga families descended from Maria Versosa Palmero Lizarrabal of Albay. Another relative, Felipe Maria de Govantes, was a writer and historian like Don Pedro.

The Mayorazgo de Mariquina or the Mayoralty of Marikina was held by the Chinese-Filipino Tuason family, now headed by Severo Tuason.

Also, many Filipinos held Spanish titles in their own right.

Isabela Gonzalez y Ferrer viuda de Ynchausti, was Marquise of Viademonte and matriarch of the once powerful and entrepreneurial Ynchausti clan.

Margarita Zobel de Ayala was Countess of Peracamps (her husband Antonio Melian descended from General Van Halen of Barcelona and was owner of El Hogar Filipino and its headquarters in Binondo/ Santa Cruz Manila area). Her direct descendant is the current count, now based in Peru, Pedro Melian y Ugarte.

Another Zobel descendant, Jaime Juan Urquijo y Zobel de Ayala, is a grandson of Juan Urquijo Chacon and related to the Marquess of Urquijo. The Urquijo family once owned Banco Urquijo and held high positions in Tabacalera.

The immensely patriotic, military and entrepreneurial Pardo de Tavera family was perhaps the most powerful Filipino-Spanish family as their ancestor Juan Pardo de Tavera was Inquisitor General of Spain and the right hand of his Majesty King Philip II of Spain himself. They were descended from Guiomar Pardo de Tavera, the Marquise of Magahon and Countess of El Alcazar de Toledo, titles now held by the Dukes of Medinaceli, because the Loinaz-Pardo de Taveras, while senior in the line of succession, refused to succeed as they did not want to lose their Filipino citizenship being very prominent supporters of the Philippine Revolution almost 150 years ago, before the Philippines and Spain enacted dual citizenship treaties that are enforced today.

Isabel Preysler descended from the Marquis of Altamira and the Marquis of Las Salinas. Miss Preysler is the mother of Enrique Iglesias and who was once Marquise of Grinyon, and now future Marquise of Vargas Llosa. Her daughter, Tamara Isabel Falco y Presyler, was chosen by her father to inherit the title of Marquess of Griñón.

Victoria Gonzalez y Quirino, granddaughter of former Philippine President Elpidio Quirino was married to Manuel Alvarez de Toledo, 5th Duke of Zaragoza. Her daughters with the Duke, Victoria, Maria and Lucia, also hold titles.

Sylvia Landahl y Hagedorn was married to Alvaro Moreno, the 8th  and 13th Marquis of La Eliseda.

The current Queen of Spain Letizia's maternal grandmother Enriqueta Rodriguez Figarredo's father was born in the Philippines, and while being of unmixed Spanish extraction, is also considered a Filipino for having been born in Manila during the time when the term Filipino referred exclusively to Spaniards born in the archipelago; hence, insulares.

Celebration in other countries

See also
Public holidays in the Philippines
Foreign relations of the Philippines
Foreign relations of Spain
Philippines-Spain relations
Hispanic influence on Filipino culture
Spanish language in the Philippines
 Spanish-Philippine Friendship Dinner & Symposium 2010 – Asociación Cultural Galeón de Manila (in Spanish)
 Spanish-Philippine Friendship Round Table 2011 – Asociación Cultural Galeón de Manila (in Spanish)

Notes

External links

Activities
List of activities related to the Philippine-Spanish Friendship Day 2009 in Baler, Philippines
Celebration of Philippine-Spanish Friendship Day 2010 in Madrid, Spain – Asociación Cultural Galeon de Manila (in Spanish)

Photos

Others

Public holidays in the Philippines
June observances
Philippines–Spain relations
2002 establishments in the Philippines
Recurring events established in 2002